The George Medal (GM), instituted on 24 September 1940 by King George VI, is a decoration of the United Kingdom and Commonwealth, awarded for gallantry, typically by civilians, or in circumstances where military honours are not appropriate.

History
In 1940, at the height of the Blitz, there was a strong desire to reward many acts of civilian courage. Existing awards open to civilians were not considered suitable to meet the new situation, so the George Cross and the George Medal were instituted to recognise civilian gallantry in the face of enemy bombing, and brave deeds more generally.

Announcing the new awards, the King said

The warrant for the GM (along with that of the GC), dated 24 January 1941, was published in The London Gazette on 31 January 1941.

Criteria
The medal is granted in recognition of "acts of great bravery". The original warrant for the George Medal did not explicitly permit it to be awarded posthumously. The position was clarified in December 1977 expressly to allow posthumous awards, several of which have subsequently been made.

The medal is primarily a civilian award, but it may be awarded to military personnel for gallant conduct that is not in the face of the enemy. As the warrant states:

Recipients are entitled to the post-nominal letters GM.

Bars to the GM may be awarded in recognition of further acts of bravery meriting the award. In undress uniform or on occasions when the medal ribbon alone is worn, a silver rosette is worn on the ribbon to indicate each bar.  

Details of all awards to British and Commonwealth recipients are published in The London Gazette.  Approximately 2,122 medals have been awarded since inception in 1940, with 27 second-award bars.

Description
The GM is a circular silver medal  in diameter, with the ribbon suspended from a ring. It has the following design.

The obverse depicts the crowned effigy of the reigning monarch. To date, there have been four types:

The reverse shows Saint George on horseback slaying the dragon on the coast of England, with the legend THE GEORGE MEDAL around the top edge of the medal.

The blue colour is taken from the George Cross ribbon. The medal is worn on the left chest by men; women not in uniform wear the medal on the left shoulder, with the ribbon fashioned into a bow.

The name of the recipient is engraved on the rim of the medal, although some Army awards have impressed naming.

Recipients

The first recipients, listed in The London Gazette of 30 September 1940, were Chief Officer Ernest Herbert Harmer and Second Officer Cyril William Arthur Brown of the Dover Fire Brigade, and Section Officer Alexander Edmund Campbell of the Dover Auxiliary Fire Service, who on 29 July had volunteered to return to a ship loaded with explosives in Dover Harbour to fight fires aboard while an air raid was in progress. Seven other people were also awarded the medal, including the first women; Ambulance Driver Dorothy Clarke and Ambulance Attendant Bessie Jane Hepburn of Aldeburgh, Suffolk, for rescuing a man badly injured in an explosion.

The first recipient chronologically was Coxswain Robert Cross, commander of the RNLI lifeboat City of Bradford, based at Spurn Point, whose award was gazetted on 7 February 1941. It was awarded for an incident on 2 February 1940 when Cross took the lifeboat out in gale force winds, snow squalls, and very rough seas to rescue the crew of a steam trawler.

The youngest recipient was Charity Anne Bick, who lied about her age to join the ARP service at 14 years old, and who delivered several messages by bicycle during a heavy air raid in West Bromwich in late 1940.

The first person to receive a second award was George Samuel Sewell, an engineer working for Shell-Mex and BP Ltd., based at the oil terminal at Salt End, near Hull, for his actions during an air raid. Having been one of the first recipients (in September 1940) his bar to the George Medal was gazetted on 4 July 1941.

The year 2015 included the 75th anniversary of the creation of the award, and was marked by a ceremony in London.

See also
 Orders and decorations of the Commonwealth realms

Notes

Bibliography
 
 Dorling, H. Taprell, (1956), Ribbons and Medals, A. H. Baldwin & Son

External links

 New Zealand Defence Force – Medal information page
 Search recommendations for the George Medal on The UK National Archives website
 British Military & Criminal History in the period 1900 to 1999 – George Medal

Awards established in 1940
1940 establishments in the United Kingdom
Civil awards and decorations of the United Kingdom
Decorations of the Merchant Navy
Courage awards
George VI